Victor Amaya and Hank Pfister were the defending champions.

Amaya and Pfister successfully defended their title, defeating Heinz Günthardt and Balázs Taróczy 6–4, 6–2 in the final.

Seeds

Draw

Draw

External links
 Draw

Tokyo Indoor
1981 Grand Prix (tennis)